This event was not held from 1989 onwards, so not defending champions were declared. Beth Herr and Candy Reynolds were the last champions in the 1988 edition.

Jill Craybas and Marlene Weingärtner won the title, defeating Emmanuelle Gagliardi and Anna-Lena Grönefeld 7–5, 7–6(7–2) in the final. It was the 2nd title for Craybas and the 1st and only title for Weingärtner, in their respective careers.

Seeds

Draw

Draw

External links
 Main and Qualifying Draws

2004 Western & Southern Financial Group Masters